Center (or Tsentr, Russian: Центр) is a Russian-speaking band, which can be described as eclectic and experimental. The styles of their music are very different, starting with new wave and Russian rock in the early years, crossing over to electronica.

Center was founded by Vasily Shumov in Moscow, Russia in the late 1970s. The first band name was "777". In the early 1980s Center became popular in the Soviet music underground. The band released over 25 albums, created music for films and TV, appeared on TV shows, and performed in Europe and America. Center is documented in numerous publications and books.

In the 1990s, the band leader Shumov moved from Moscow, Russia to Los Angeles, United States where he continued his music and art work.

An album "Plastikozamenitel'" ("Plastic substitute") from 2000 is the first release of Center that features the new concept of so-called Centroborators. Centroborators are the artists from various locations, who contribute to the albums of Center, transferring their digital recordings to Vasily Shumov's studio using internet. Several albums after "Plastikozamenitel" were created using the Centroborators concept.

Since the mid-2000s, the band recommenced activities in Russia.

References

External links
Centromania.com - official site (in Russian, with an English section)

Musical groups from Moscow
Russian rock music groups
Russian new wave musical groups
Russian electronic music groups
Soviet rock music groups